Seth Wilbur Moulton (born October 24, 1978) is an American politician serving as the U.S. representative for Massachusetts's 6th congressional district since 2015. A former Marine Corps officer, he is a member of the Democratic Party.

After graduating from Harvard University in 2001 with a Bachelor of Arts in physics, Moulton joined the United States Marine Corps. He served four tours in Iraq and then earned his master's degrees in business and public policy in a dual program at Harvard. He entered politics in 2014, when he was elected to represent Massachusetts's 6th congressional district.

In early 2019, Moulton was seen as a potential presidential candidate for the Democratic nomination in 2020. Publicly expressing his interest in the prospect, he traveled to early primary states. After announcing his candidacy on April 22, 2019, Moulton withdrew from the race on August 23.

Early life, education, and commission
Moulton was born on October 24, 1978, in Salem, Massachusetts, to Lynn Alice (née Meader), a secretary, and Wilbur Thomas Moulton, Jr., a real estate attorney. He has two younger siblings, Eliza and Cyrus, and grew up in Marblehead, Massachusetts. He graduated from Phillips Academy in 1997, and attended Harvard College, where he earned a bachelor's degree in physics in 2001. He gave the Undergraduate English Oration at his commencement, focusing on the importance of service.

Moulton joined the Marine Corps after graduation, a few months before the September 11 attacks. He attended the Officer Candidate School in Quantico, Virginia, and graduated in 2002 with the rank of second lieutenant.

Military career
During the 2003 invasion of Iraq, Moulton led one of the first infantry platoons to enter Baghdad. He served a total of four tours of duty in Iraq from 2003 to 2008. Moulton took part in the 2003 Battle of Nasiriyah, leading a platoon that cleared a hostile stronghold. In that action, he went to the aid of a Marine wounded by friendly fire, and for his actions he was awarded the Navy and Marine Corps Medal for valor. Moulton was active in combat against insurgent forces in Iraq, including the 2004 Battle of Najaf against the militia of Muqtada al-Sadr. Over two days, he "fearlessly exposed himself to enemy fire" as his platoon was pinned down under heavy fire and then directed the supporting fire that repelled the attack. He received the Bronze Star Medal for his actions in this battle.

In 2008, during Moulton's fourth tour of duty in Iraq, General David Petraeus requested that he be assigned to work as a special liaison with tribal leaders in Southern Iraq. After that tour, Moulton was discharged from the Marine Corps with the rank of captain.

Media contributions
In 2003, Moulton co-hosted a television program with his Iraqi interpreter, Mohammed Harba, called Moulton and Mohammed, in which they discussed regional conditions in the period following the U.S. invasion before an audience of U.S. servicemen and Iraqi citizens. The show ended after three months when Moulton's unit left the area.

Between 2003 and 2008, Moulton was frequently interviewed about his experiences as an officer in Iraq by U.S. national media, including CNN, MSNBC, and NPR programs Morning Edition and All Things Considered.

Moulton was also prominently featured in the 2007 Academy Award-nominated documentary No End in Sight. In the film, he criticizes the U.S. government's handling of the occupation of Iraq. Director Charles H. Ferguson chose to include Moulton and two other Iraq veterans.

Private sector career
After he left the Marines Corps in 2008, Moulton attended a dual-degree program at the Harvard Business School and the Harvard Kennedy School, earning master's degrees in business and public policy in 2011. After graduate school, he worked for one year as managing director of the Texas Central Railway, a transportation firm. In 2011, Moulton and a graduate school classmate founded Eastern Healthcare Partners, which Moulton has invoked to show he was a "successful entrepreneur" who understands "what it's like to face that day when you might not meet payroll". The company raised investor funds and drafted a partnership agreement with Johns Hopkins School of Medicine, but in October 2014 the Boston Globe reported that by the time Moulton ran for Congress, EHP had no revenue, was still incubating, and had closed its only Massachusetts office.

U.S. House of Representatives

Elections

2012 speculation
Moulton considered running against Democratic Representative John F. Tierney of Massachusetts's 6th congressional district as an Independent in 2012, but decided against it in July 2012, saying, "the time and the logistics of putting together all the campaign infrastructure, organizing the volunteers ... the fundraising—it's just too much to accomplish in three months." He told Roll Call that his own polling "showed there was in fact a clear path to victory" and said he might run for office in the future.

2014 election
On July 8, 2013, Moulton announced his candidacy in the 2014 congressional race for Massachusetts's 6th district. The race had been recognized for its competitiveness by national and regional media throughout the election cycle. Moulton challenged Tierney in the Democratic primary.

Tierney's campaign claimed in campaign advertisements that Moulton received campaign contributions from a New Hampshire political action committee that previously donated only to Republicans, implying that Moulton must hold conservative views. Moulton denied being more conservative than Tierney, and said that the Republican PAC donation was returned. Public Federal Election Commission filings confirmed that the donation was returned in February 2014.

Moulton said that he opposed the Iraq War in which he served. A Tierney campaign staff member said that Moulton had "changed his mind" and highlighted Tierney's vote in Congress to oppose the 2002 resolution authorizing the U.S. Invasion of Iraq. Moulton also received Retired General Stanley McChrystal's first-ever political endorsement during the campaign.

Moulton won the primary with 50.8% of the vote to Tierney's 40.1%.

Moulton was endorsed by Senator Elizabeth Warren in the general election. In October 2014, he withdrew from a debate sponsored by radio station WGBH because of a series of New York fundraisers, where he welcomed Democratic National Committee Chairwoman Debbie Wasserman Schultz. The campaigns of Moulton and his Republican opponent, Richard Tisei, were held up as an example of how candidates can compete with respect for each other.

Moulton won the general election with 55.0% of the vote to Tisei's 41.1%.

2016 election
Moulton was unopposed for reelection in 2016.

2018 election
Moulton ran against Republican nominee Joseph Schneider in 2018. He won with 65.2% of the vote.

2020 election
Moulton faced his first primary challenge since taking office. He defeated Democratic challengers Angus McQuilken and Jamie Belsito with 78% of the vote, and defeated Republican nominee John Paul Moran with 65.4% of the vote.

Tenure
Moulton was sworn into the 114th United States Congress on January 3, 2015.

Following the 2018 elections, Democrats won the majority in the House of Representatives. Moulton and some others who felt current leadership was "too old" gathered signatures to replace Nancy Pelosi as the Democrats' leader. Representative Karen Bass was their first choice for leader. Bass rejected the offer, as did others, choosing instead to support Pelosi. On November 28, 2018, Pelosi won the speakership on a 203-to-32 vote, with Moulton voting for her.

On August 24, 2021, Moulton and Representative Peter Meijer flew unannounced into Hamid Karzai International Airport amid the evacuation of Americans and allies after the fall of Kabul. The two explained that their visit was kept secret to minimize disruption, and that its goal was "to provide guidance" to the Biden administration. But several government officials said that the surprise visit produced unhelpful distraction from the ongoing work of evacuating people. The next day, Pelosi sent a letter to all House members saying that "the Departments of Defense and State have requested that Members not travel to Afghanistan and the region during this time of danger" because such travel "would unnecessarily divert needed resources" from the evacuation efforts. Moulton defended his Kabul trip, saying, "At the end of the day, I don’t care what pundits in Washington are saying...They’ve been wrong about this war for 20 years."

Committee assignments 
 Committee on Strategic Competition between the United States and the Chinese Communist Party
 Committee on Armed Services 
 Subcommittee on Strategic Forces
 Subcommittee on Cyber, Information Technologies, and Innovation
 Committee on Transportation and Infrastructure
 Subcommittee on Highways and Transit
 Subcommittee on Railroads, Pipelines, and Hazardous Materials
 Subcommittee on Water Resources and Environment

Caucus memberships
New Democrat Coalition
Blue Collar Caucus

2020 presidential campaign

Early in 2019, Moulton began to recruit staff for a potential campaign for the 2020 Democratic presidential nomination. He traveled to early primary states such as Iowa and New Hampshire in March 2019.

Moulton officially announced his candidacy on April 22, 2019. On August 23, he suspended his campaign and withdrew from the race. During his campaign, Moulton never polled above 2% in any Democratic presidential opinion poll, and he was not invited to the first two Democratic presidential debates, having failed to meet the criteria for invitation.

After he withdrew, Moulton's candidacy generated interest after President Donald Trump sarcastically tweeted, in response to stock market fluctuations, "The Dow is down 573 points on the news that Representative Seth Moulton, whoever that may be, has dropped out of the 2020 Presidential Race!"

Political positions

According to Politico, Moulton has called himself "a progressive Democrat," "a pragmatic Democrat", and "a frustrated Democrat."

Moulton is a member of the New Democrat Coalition, a congressional caucus of Democrats who call themselves "moderate", "pro-growth", and "fiscally responsible", and whom others call "centrist." Moulton was ranked the 34th most bipartisan member of the U.S. House of Representatives during the 114th United States Congress by The Lugar Center and the McCourt School of Public Policy's Bipartisan Index, which ranks members of by their degree of bipartisanship (by measuring how often each member's bills attract co-sponsors from the opposite party and how often each member co-sponsors bills by members of the opposite party).

Economics
According to The Boston Globe, "one of Moulton’s biggest focuses is addressing the long-term impact of automation on the economy, which he says will disproportionately affect working-class communities."

Moulton, who in 2015 co-sponsored legislation increasing the federal minimum wage to $12 an hour, said in February 2019 that he supported an increase to $15 an hour.

In 2019, Moulton criticized Trump's withdrawal from the Trans-Pacific Partnership and said that, if elected president, he would reengage in negotiations for "a strong, fair trade deal for the Pacific on our terms, not China's". He also criticized Trump's use of tariffs, telling The Hill that although tariffs remain an option for trade policy the emphasis should be "a comprehensive strategy" and building "our alliances in the Pacific".

Foreign policy
Moulton opposed sending U.S. troops back to Iraq in 2014. He also supported strengthening NATO against Russia and keeping troops in Afghanistan temporarily in order to execute a counterterrorist mission in 2019.

Moulton criticized President Joe Biden for the withdrawal of U.S. troops from Afghanistan, citing the chaotic evacuation of Afghans who had supported the U.S. in the effort to fight terrorism. He and Representative Don Bacon later co-sponsored the WELCOMED Act, to provide benefits and eligibility for resettlement to Afghan recipients of Special Immigrant Visas, which Biden signed into law on October 1, 2021.

Social issues
Moulton supports same-sex marriage and abortion rights. He supports legal immigration and advocates for immigration reform, but opposes illegal immigration and has called it "something we have to confront".

Mental health
Moulton wrote the legislation to create the National 988 Suicide and Mental Health Crisis Hotline. He also introduced the Brandon Act, a law intended to improve mental health access for active duty armed service members.

Marijuana
Moulton has admitted to using marijuana and supports its legalization, saying, "If you're not buying your marijuana from a dealer who sells heroin, who sells opioids, it's much less likely to be a gateway drug. The problem is now that it operates in the shadows. There's no control whatsoever. Someone goes and buys an edible, for example, there's no regulation about what's in that. It's like moonshine under Prohibition."

Cybersecurity
In September 2018, Moulton, Elise Stefanik, and Dan Donovan co-sponsored the "Cyber Ready Workforce Act" advanced by Jacky Rosen. The legislation would create a grant program within the Department of Labor to "create, implement and expand registered apprenticeships" in cybersecurity. It aims to offer certifications and connect participants with businesses to "boost the number" of workers for federal cybersecurity jobs.

Voting age
In January 2023, Moulton was one of 13 cosponsors of an amendment to the Constitution of the United States extending the right to vote to citizens sixteen years of age or older.

Energy policy
Moulton supports the expansion of nuclear energy. In a 2019 interview, he called nuclear energy "a safe, good investment...for the future of our country." He has also expressed support for the expansion of research and development for fusion power.

Views on President Trump
In a March 2016 interview, Moulton compared the rise of Republican presidential front-runner Donald Trump to Adolf Hitler's rise to power in the 1930s. Moulton said that, to understand how an educated society "can elect a demagogue", voters should read about how the German people elected Hitler in the early 20th century.

Moulton walked out of Trump's 2020 State of the Union address, citing the part of the address about the administration's contributions to the military and service members. Moulton said: "Trump—a draft dodger who has mocked Senator John McCain, Gold Star families, and soldiers with traumatic brain injury—started talking about the good he has done for our military."

Gun policy
On June 15, 2016, Moulton appeared on the cover of the New York Daily News with the headline "No Civilian Should Own This Gun", in reference to semi-automatic assault weapons. The cover shows Moulton during a deployment to Iraq, carrying an issued M4 carbine.

Moulton penned an opinion piece promoting gun control, including the statement: "There's simply no reason for a civilian to own a military-style assault weapon. It's no different than why we outlaw civilian ownership of rockets and landmines."

Personal life
On June 23, 2017, Moulton announced his engagement to his girlfriend Liz Boardman, a senior client partner at an executive search firm. They were married at the Old North Church in Marblehead, Massachusetts, on September 22, 2017. Their first child was born in October 2018. In 2019, Moulton announced that he was suffering from post-traumatic stress disorder (PTSD) following his service in the Marine Corps. On August 29, 2020, Moulton announced that the family was expecting a second child, who was born in February 2021.

Electoral history

|-
| colspan=10 |
|-
!Year
!Candidate
!Result
!Opponent
!Result
|-
| style="text-align: left;" | 2014
| style="background:#ccf;"| Seth Moulton
| style="background:#ccf;"| 50.8%
| style="background:#ccf;"| John F. Tierney
| style="background:#ccf;"| 40.1%
|-
| style="text-align: left;" | 2016
| style="background:#ccf;"| Seth Moulton
| style="background:#ccf;"| 99.1%
| style="background:#ccf;"| None
| style="background:#ccf;"| N/A
|-
| style="text-align: left;" | 2018
| style="background:#ccf;"| Seth Moulton
| style="background:#ccf;"| 100%
| style="background:#ccf;"| None
| style="background:#ccf;"| N/A
|-
| style="text-align: left;" | 2020
| style="background:#ccf;"| Seth Moulton
| style="background:#ccf;"| 77.9%
| style="background:#ccf;"| Jamie Belsito, Angus McQuilken
| style="background:#ccf;"| Belsito-12.5%, McQuilken-9.6%
|-
| style="text-align: left;" | 2022
| style="background:#ccf;"| Seth Moulton
| style="background:#ccf;"| 100%
| style="background:#ccf;"| None
| style="background:#ccf;"| N/A
|-

|-
| colspan=10 |
|-
! Year
! Democrat
! Result
! Opponent
! Result
|-
| style="text-align: left;" | 2014
| style="background:#ccf;"| Seth Moulton
| style="background:#ccf;"| 55.0%
| style="background:#fcc;"| Richard Tisei
| style="background:#fcc;"| 41.1%
|-
|-
| style="text-align: left;" | 2016
| style="background:#ccf;"| Seth Moulton
| style="background:#ccf;"| 98.4%
| style="background:#fcc;"| None
| style="background:#fcc;"| N/A
|-
|-
| style="text-align: left;" | 2018
| style="background:#ccf;"| Seth Moulton
| style="background:#ccf;"| 65.2%
| style="background:#fcc;"| Joseph Schneider
| style="background:#fcc;"| 31.4%
|-
|-
| style="text-align: left;" | 2020
| style="background:#ccf;"| Seth Moulton
| style="background:#ccf;"| 65.4%
| style="background:#fcc;"| John Paul Moran
| style="background:#fcc;"| 34.4%
|-
|-
| style="text-align: left;" | 2022
| style="background:#ccf;"| Seth Moulton
| style="background:#ccf;"| 62.9%
| style="background:#fcc;"| Bob May
| style="background:#fcc;"| 35.2%
| style="background:#DCB732;"| Mark Tashjian
| style="background:##DCB732;"| 1.9%
|-

Notes

References

External links

 Congressman Seth Moulton official U.S. House website
 Seth Moulton for Congress

 

|-

1978 births
21st-century American politicians
United States Marine Corps personnel of the Iraq War
Democratic Party members of the United States House of Representatives from Massachusetts
Harvard Business School alumni
Harvard Kennedy School alumni
Living people
Military personnel from Massachusetts
Politicians from Salem, Massachusetts
United States Marine Corps officers
Candidates in the 2020 United States presidential election